Zyryanovka is a rural locality (a selo) and the administrative center of Zyryanovsky Selsoviet, Zarinsky District, Altai Krai, Russia. The population was 355 as of 2013. There are 10 streets.

Geography 
Zyryanovka is located 54 km east of Zarinsk (the district's administrative centre) by road. Zhulanikha is the nearest rural locality.

References 

Rural localities in Zarinsky District